is a former Japanese football player.

Playing career
Eguchi was born in Hyogo Prefecture on April 22, 1977. After graduating from high school, he joined Japan Football League club Vissel Kobe based in his local in 1996. The club won the 2nd place in 1996 and was promoted to J1 League from 1997. He played many matches as forward until 1998. However he could hardly play in the match in 1999. In 2000, he moved to Avispa Fukuoka. Although he played many matches, the club was relegated to J2 League from 2002. He retired end of 2003 season.

Club statistics

References

External links

Official blog

1977 births
Living people
Association football people from Hyōgo Prefecture
Japanese footballers
J1 League players
J2 League players
Japan Football League (1992–1998) players
Vissel Kobe players
Avispa Fukuoka players
Association football forwards